"I Wonder"  is a song written by Leroy Preston, and recorded by American country music artist Rosanne Cash.  It was released in October 1982 as the second single from the album Somewhere in the Stars.  The song reached #8 on the Billboard Hot Country Singles & Tracks chart.

Chart performance

References

1983 singles
1982 songs
Rosanne Cash songs
Columbia Records singles
Song recordings produced by Rodney Crowell